Genoplesium vernale, commonly known as the spring midge orchid or East Lynne midge orchid is a small terrestrial orchid which is endemic to a small area on the south coast of New South Wales. It has a single thin leaf and up to twenty five dark purplish-black flowers with tiny glandular hairs on the sepals and petals.

Description
There is a dark purple to brownish-black callus in the centre of the labellum and extending almost to its tip. Flowering occurs between September and December.

Taxonomy and naming
Genoplesium vernale was first formally described in 2001 by David Jones and the description was published in The Orchadian. In 2002, Jones and Mark Clements changed the name to Corunastylis vernalis. The specific epithet (vernale) is a Latin word meaning "spring".<ref name="latdict">{{cite web|title=vernalis|url=https://www.perseus.tufts.edu/hopper/text?doc=Perseus:text:1999.04.0059:entry=vernalis|publisher=Latin Dictionary and Grammar Resources|accessdate=10 February 2018}}</ref>

Distribution and habitat
The spring midge orchid grows in shrubby forest between Jervis Bay and Mogo.

A survey conducted in 2000 found about 450 plants but the number is probably greater since not all suitable habitat has been surveyed. The main threats to the species are land clearing, forestry operations and inappropriate fire regimes. The species is listed as "Vulnerable" under the Commonwealth Government Environment Protection and Biodiversity Conservation Act 1999 (EPBC) Act and the New South Wales  Threatened Species Conservation Act 1995''.

References

External links
 
 

vernale
Endemic orchids of Australia
Orchids of New South Wales
Plants described in 2001